The 2016–2017 Israeli Basketball Super League, for sponsorship reasons Ligat Winner, was the 63rd season of the Israeli Basketball Super League. Maccabi Rishon LeZion was the defending champion. The regular season started on October 8, 2016, and ended on May 15, 2017.

Teams

Hapoel Gilboa Galil has been promoted to the league after winning 2015–16 National League. Ironi Nes Ziona who finished in last place during the 2015–2016 season, relegated from the Super League.

Stadia and locations

Personnel and sponsorship

Managerial changes

Regular season
The regular season started on October 8, 2016, and ended on May 15, 2017.

Standings

Results

Rounds 1–22

Rounds 23–33

Play-offs

|}
Source: Ligat Winner

Final Four

Final standings

Statistical leaders

|  style="width:50%; vertical-align:top;"|

Points

|}
|}

|  style="width:50%; vertical-align:top;"|

Assists

|}
|}
Source: Basket.co.il

Season highs

Source: RealGM

All-Star Game
The 2017 Israeli League All-star event was held on 18 April 2017, at the Menora Mivtachim Arena in Tel Aviv.

Three-point shootout

Slam Dunk Contest

Awards

Yearly awards

Regular season MVP

 John DiBartolomeo (Maccabi Haifa)

All-BSL 1st team
 John DiBartolomeo (Maccabi Haifa)
 Curtis Jerrells (Hapoel Jerusalem)
 Andrew Goudelock (Maccabi Tel Aviv)
 James Bell (Hapoel Holon)
 Karam Mashour (Bnei Herzliya)

All-BSL 2nd team
 Gregory Vargas (Maccabi Haifa)
 Rafi Menco (Hapoel Eilat)
 Landon Milbourne (Hapoel Eilat)
 Jonathan Skjöldebrand (Ironi Nahariya)
 Darion Atkins (Hapoel Holon)

Coach of the Season
 Simone Pianigiani (Hapoel Jerusalem)

Rising Star
 Tomer Ginat (Hapoel Tel Aviv)

Best Defender
 Gregory Vargas (Maccabi Haifa)

Most Improved Player
 Idan Zalmanson (Maccabi Rishon LeZion)
 Rafi Menco (Hapoel Eilat)

Sixth Man of the Season
 Jason Siggers (Hapoel Gilboa Galil)

Monthly Awards

Player of the Month

Israeli Player of the Month

Coach of the Month

MVP of the Round

Regular season

Playoffs

Attendance
Included playoffs games.

Other articles
2016–17 Israeli Basketball State Cup
2016 Israeli Basketball League Cup

External links
Official website

References

Israeli Basketball Premier League seasons
Israeli
Basketball